The Face at the Window is a 1913 American short silent film drama produced by the Kalem Company. The film starred Earle Foxe, Irene Boyle and Stuart Holmes in the lead roles.

Plot
As described in a 1913 blurb: "The foreman of the sawmill misconstrues the disappearance of his ward who has taken drastic measures to protect her guardian's interests.  A startling incident reveals the girl's motive."

Reception
Moving Picture World described the "first few scenes as a bit wearisome, because it cannot be seen that they are aiming at any particular story, but toward the end it does present a definite situation that holds. ... We didn't expect to see the girl take that dive into the river after the villainous thief, and it gave us a thrill, and there are one or two other good things in the picture."  The review complimented the film for "some pretty backgrounds, but mostly they are out of focus."

Cast

 Earle Foxe as Harold
 Irene Boyle as Ruth
 James Ross as Edward (mill owner) 
 Stuart Holmes as the thief

References

External links

1913 films
1913 drama films
American silent short films
American black-and-white films
Kalem Company films
1913 short films
Silent American drama films
1910s American films
1910s English-language films